Thomas Kennedy Chalmers (1883 – 20 April 1918) was a Scottish footballer who played in the Football League for Notts County.

Personal life
Chalmers was married. He served as a private in the Highland Light Infantry during the First World War and was killed in action on the Western Front on 20 April 1918. He is buried at Doullens Communal Cemetery Extension No.1.

References

1883 births
1918 deaths
Scottish footballers
English Football League players
Association football midfielders
Beith F.C. players
Notts County F.C. players
Ilkeston United F.C. players
Shirebrook Miners Welfare F.C. players
British Army personnel of World War I
Highland Light Infantry soldiers
British military personnel killed in World War I